In model theory, a branch of mathematical logic, a C-minimal theory is a theory that is  "minimal" with respect to a ternary relation C with certain properties. Algebraically closed fields with a (Krull) valuation are perhaps the most important example.

This notion was defined in analogy to the o-minimal theories, which are "minimal" (in the same sense) with respect to a linear order.

Definition

A C-relation is a ternary relation C(x;y,z) that satisfies the following axioms.
 
 
 
 
A C-minimal structure is a structure M, in a signature containing the symbol C, such that C satisfies the above axioms and every set of elements of M that is definable with parameters in M is a Boolean combination of instances of C, i.e. of formulas of the form C(x;b,c), where b and c are elements of M.

A theory is called C-minimal if all of its models are C-minimal. A structure is called strongly C-minimal if its theory is C-minimal. One can construct C-minimal structures which are not strongly C-minimal.

Example

For a prime number p and a p-adic number a, let |a|p denote its p-adic absolute value. The theory of Qp as a field, however, is not C-minimal.

References

 
 

Model theory